Chrome Dreams is a 1977 unreleased album by Neil Young, and also an acetate from that period which is claimed to be of that album.

Jimmy McDonough's Shakey: Neil Young's Biography supports the claim that Chrome Dreams is indeed a bootlegged acetate with said title. A document that accompanied the acetate (which according to Young's archivist Joel Bernstein is a forgery) gave the impression that Young had officially given Chrome Dreams as the title, inspired by rumours in the press of a new album with the same title. Young is quoted as saying "What Chrome Dreams really was, was a sketch that [David] Briggs drew of a grille and front of a '55 Chrysler, and if you turned it on its end, it was this beautiful chick...I called it Chrome Dreams."

Writing in The Guardian, Alexis Petridis opined that the album "could have been Young's strongest album of the 70s". There have been a number of unofficial recreations of Chrome Dreams.  Three of the songs featured on Chrome Dreams were officially released in September 2017 on Hitchhiker.

On October 23, 2007, Neil Young released a new album entitled Chrome Dreams II.

Song information
Chrome Dreams features a large amount of still-unreleased material. The version of "Powderfinger" included is the original acoustic demo, while the "Sedan Delivery" featured is at a slower pace than the Rust Never Sleeps take and contains an additional verse. "Pocahontas" is the same version heard on Rust Never Sleeps without overdubs. "Hold Back the Tears" is a radically different take compared to the one that appears on American Stars 'n Bars, also featuring additional lyrics. "Too Far Gone" would not see release until 1989's Freedom. It is presented on Chrome Dreams with Crazy Horse's Frank "Poncho" Sampedro accompanying Young on a 1917 mandolin. "Stringman", a piano ballad, was (according to Shakey) written for Jack Nitzsche and is presented as a performance from Young's 1976 European tour with slight studio overdubs. Eighteen years later Young revived it for his Unplugged performance, never having released the song as a studio track. "Homegrown" here is a different mix than the version on American Stars 'n Bars. The rest of the songs are for the most part identical to their releases on subsequent albums.

Track listing

References

Albums produced by Neil Young
Neil Young albums
Unreleased albums